Redlynch is a village and former manor in the civil parish of Bruton, in the South Somerset district of Somerset, England. The 18th-century church and a folly named The Towers are of architectural interest.

History

Ownership
In the mid-12th century the manor of Redlynch was held by Henry Lovel (died 1194) of Castle Cary. It was later part of the hundred of Bruton.

In the late 14th century it was acquired by James FitzJames (died c. 1391), whose great-grandson, Sir John FitzJames (died c. 1542), Chief Justice of the King's Bench, is recorded in 1538 as having a house at Redlynch which included a "great chamber over a parlour". He was succeeded by his cousin Sir Nicholas FitzJames, who made improvements to the house. Sir Nicholas's heir was his nephew John FitzJames, who in 1617 sold the estate to Sir Robert Gorges of Bristol.

In 1617 Sir Robert Gorges of Bristol purchased the estate from John FitzJames. Helena Snakenborg, a lady-in-waiting to Queen Elizabeth I and widow successively of William Parr, Marquis of Northampton, and of Sir Thomas Gorges, died at the age of 86 on 10 April 1635 at Redlynch, then the residence of her son, Sir Robert Gorges. She was buried on 14 May in Salisbury Cathedral. In 1672 the Gorges family conveyed the estate to Sir Stephen Fox (1627–1716) in settlement of a debt.

Having acquired what was by then a large 16th-century manor house in 1672, Sir Stephen Fox, paymaster-general to King Charles II, commenced repairs on it in 1688. In 1708/09 he began building a new house adjacent to the old one, to designs by the architect Thomas Fort. He also laid out formal gardens.

The estate descended to Fox's eldest son Stephen Fox-Strangways, 1st Earl of Ilchester (1704–1776), who in the first half of the 18th century built the east wing of the house to the design of Nathaniel Ireson of Wincanton. He also expanded the park and installed decorative features such as a lake, a waterfall, a temple, a Chinese seat and a bird house. In 1755 Ilchester added a Gothic-style entrance gate on the west side, designed by Henry Flitcroft. King George III was a visitor to Redlynch on his way to Weymouth.

Henry Fox-Strangways, 2nd Earl of Ilchester (1747–1802) transferred his principal seat to Melbury in Dorset, but information about the Ilchester household at Redlynch survives in the published diaries and correspondence of Agnes Porter, a Scottish-born governess to his many daughters from 1784 to 1797. The Redlynch estate suffered from neglect, but in the 1790s he planned to convert the deer park to agricultural use, which scheme was effected by his son Henry Fox-Strangways, 3rd Earl of Ilchester (1787–1858). In 1851 part of the house was in use as a farmhouse.

In 1901 Henry Fox-Strangways, 5th Earl of Ilchester (1847–1905), still seated at Melbury, converted the service block into his principal residence on the estate, to the designs of Sir Edwin Lutyens. The west block was previously the stable. Within the grounds were an orangery, summerhouse and a walled kitchen garden.

Speculators and wartime use
In 1912 the estate was sold by Giles Fox-Strangways, 6th Earl of Ilchester (1874–1959) to the Cavendish Land Company, which in turn sold it on to a series of speculators. The new residence converted by the 5th Earl was partly destroyed by a fire in 1914 caused by suffragettes. This was later rebuilt, but at the same time the main part of the first Earl's mansion was demolished.

In 1935 it was purchased by Margaret "Daisy" Leiter (died 1967), widow of Henry Howard, 19th Earl of Suffolk, 12th Earl of Berkshire (1877–1917), and sister-in-law of Lord Curzon, who lived there until her death. During World War II the United States Army 3rd Armored Division (spearhead) was based at Redlynch Park. Remnants of the entrance bunker survive, marked with an inscribed plaque thanking the local people.

Heritage at risk
Redlynch served as a school between about 1971 and 1982, but in 1985 the house and stables were split into flats, and the orangery sold for use as a separate house.

The surviving folly known as The Towers, displaying the arms of the Fox family, features on the Heritage at Risk Register kept by English Heritage, as does the whole park.

Church of St Peter
Redlynch parish Church of St Peter, dating from 1750, was erected by the 1st Earl to designs by Nathaniel Ireson of Wincanton. It has been designated by English Heritage as a Grade II* listed building.

Notable residents
From March to October 1959, American author John Steinbeck (1902–1968) and his wife Elaine rented a cottage in the hamlet of Discove, Redlynch, while Steinbeck researched his retelling of the Arthurian legend. Glastonbury Tor was visible from the cottage, and Steinbeck also visited the nearby hillfort of Cadbury Castle, a supposed site of King Arthur's court of Camelot. The unfinished manuscript appeared after his death in 1976 as The Acts of King Arthur and His Noble Knights. The Steinbecks called the time spent in Somerset the happiest of their life together.

References

External links

Villages in South Somerset
Structures on the Heritage at Risk register in Somerset
Bruton